WUTV (channel 29) is a television station in Buffalo, New York, United States, affiliated with the Fox network. It is owned by Sinclair Broadcast Group alongside MyNetworkTV affiliate WNYO-TV (channel 49). Both stations share studios on Hertel Avenue near Military Road in Buffalo, while WUTV's transmitter is located on Whitehaven Road (near I-190) in Grand Island, New York, behind its former main studio building.

Since February 2008, WUTV serves as the Fox network feed received in the Cayman Islands. It joined the Primetime 24 lineup in 2009, serving most of the Caribbean islands. The station is also broadcast in parts of Canada.

History
WUTV signed on the air on December 21, 1970, as a general entertainment independent station, and its original studios were located at the transmitter site in Grand Island, New York. The station was owned by Ultravision Broadcasting Company, from which the "UTV" in the WUTV callsign originates. Ultravision was owned by Stan Jasinski, who had first applied for the station's license in 1963 and also owned Buffalo's WMMJ (1300 AM) at the time; shortly thereafter, Jasinski spun off WMMJ to country musician Ramblin' Lou Schriver, who turned it into present-day WXRL. The WUTV call sign was originally to be used for a station on VHF channel 3 in Indianapolis, Indiana under the ownership of department store William H. Block Co., which never went on the air; the call sign was later issued to another station in Youngstown, Ohio with a construction permit on channel 21 that also never launched, with NBC affiliate WFMJ-TV purchasing that permit and moving from channel 73 to the channel 21 allocation that the Youngstown WUTV permit was originally intended to broadcast on.

WUTV was the only independent station in Buffalo for many years; its schedule included cartoons (such as Astro Boy and Yogi Bear), sitcoms (such as The Adventures of Ozzie and Harriet, The Patty Duke Show, and The Munsters), and sci-fi shows (such as Lost in Space, Ultraman, The Invaders and Voyage to the Bottom of the Sea), along with classic movies and drama series. It was the first commercially successful UHF station in Western New York; previous efforts on the UHF dial, including WBES-TV (channel 59), WBUF-TV (channel 17), and WNYP-TV (channel 26) all had failed within a few years of their debuts. Ultravision Broadcasting sold the station to Whitehaven Entertainment Corporation in 1977. The station was acquired by Citadel Communications, a Bronxville-based company not related to the larger radio station owner Citadel Broadcasting, in 1984.

On October 9, 1986, WUTV became one of the original charter affiliates of the newly launched Fox network. At the time, Fox only aired late-night programming five days a week, so WUTV was still essentially programmed as an independent station. However, by 1989, WUTV was one of several Fox affiliates nationwide that were disappointed with the network's weak prime time programming offerings, particularly on Saturday nights, which were bogging down WUTV's otherwise successful lineup. Fox then signed an agreement with WNYB-TV (channel 49, now WNYO-TV) to become its new Buffalo affiliate, and WUTV reverted to being an independent station full-time, effective September 1, 1989.

Ahead of the disaffiliation from Fox, Act III Broadcasting (a company controlled by Norman Lear) offered to buy WUTV, and Citadel accepted. This proceeded by a duopoly waiver from WUHF in Rochester, citing cross-ownership, which was normally not allowed by the FCC, and regularly did not allow a waiver in the process, until 2000 (Act III did apply for a waiver for the station). The sale was finalized in June 1990, and Lear moved WNYB-TV's stronger programming to WUTV, in turn bringing the Fox affiliation back to the station. The Buffalo Sabres, who held a minority stake in the new WUTV, which was then sold WNYB-TV to Tri-State Christian Television (Act III was known for such acquisition practices).

ABRY Partners, forerunners to the current Nexstar Media Group, purchased WUTV in 1995 following its acquisition of the Act III group by Sullivan Broadcasting. On January 16, 1995, WUTV became a secondary affiliate of the upstart United Paramount Network (the UPN affiliation subsequently moved to WNGS (channel 67, now WBBZ-TV) in April 1998, with WONS (channel 21, WVTT-CD) simulcasting WNGS the following year, and then to WNLO (channel 23) in 2003). Sinclair Broadcast Group acquired WUTV as part of its purchase of some of ABRY's assets in 1998; Sinclair then bought WNYO-TV in 2001, creating a duopoly with WUTV. Since the 1994 NFL season, the station has aired Buffalo Bills games via the NFL on Fox; they are given at least two games a season to air, usually when the team plays host to an NFC team at Highmark Stadium; although the station has seen more games aired since 2014 when the NFL instituted cross-flex rules, meaning that games can be arbitrarily moved to the station from WIVB, which airs most of the team's games.

After Sinclair came to a retransmission consent agreement in February 2007 nationally with Time Warner Cable, WUTV and WNYO-TV's high definition feeds began to be carried locally by the provider. WUTV's HD feed was not available on the region's other cable provider, Atlantic Broadband, until 2012. The Time Warner Cable agreement was to expire at the end of 2010, and the two companies were late in reaching an agreement. In the event Sinclair had pulled WUTV from TWC, a separate agreement allows Fox programming to be piped in from out of market (likely involving Nexstar Media Group, whose stations have been used as out-of-market superstations in the past to temporarily replace in-market network affiliates displaced due to carriage disputes). This made WUTV particularly vulnerable to a prolonged blackout. It does not produce any local content, serving mostly as a "pass-through" for automated programming. Much of its syndicated programming could be seen on other cable channels (such as TBS, WGN and TVGN), and much of its daytime programming consisted of infomercials. The dispute was resolved without a blackout.
On May 15, 2012, Sinclair Broadcast Group and Fox agreed to a five-year extension to the network's affiliation agreement with Sinclair's 19 Fox stations, including WUTV, allowing them to continue carrying the network's programming until 2017. Grit was added to a subchannel in October–November 2014.

The second subchannel was affiliated with The Country Network until early 2017 when it was announced to be switching over to TBD. On June 1, 2017, both digital subchannels were replaced, 29.2 with the previously announced TBD and 29.3 with Charge!.

Averted loss of Fox affiliation
On May 8, 2017, Sinclair announced that it would acquire Tribune Media for $3.9 billion. The deal is expected to receive FCC approval sometime in the first half of 2018. The deal has brought concerns by Fox who see Sinclair as a competitor towards conservative-leaning news, as well as increased leverage by Sinclair on reverse compensation to air Fox programming.

On August 2, 2017, it was reported that Fox Television Stations was in talks with Ion Media to create a joint venture that would own their respective stations. The partnership was said to include plans to shift affiliations from Sinclair stations in favor of Ion-owned stations, such as those whose affiliation agreements are soon to expire. In Buffalo's case, this would include shifting Fox from WUTV to WPXJ-TV (channel 51). In the event that WUTV loses its Fox affiliation, the station may return to independent status.

The chances of WUTV keeping its Fox affiliation increased in October 2017 when Ion elected its stations to have must-carry status instead of retransmission consent, which the FCC ruled Ion must keep for three years. However, must-carry only applies to a main signal, allowing Fox to possibly affiliate with a digital subchannel on WPXJ-TV and other Ion stations.

On December 6, 2017, it was reported that Sinclair and Fox were working on a deal that would see its Fox affiliates renew their affiliation agreement in exchange for Sinclair selling some of its Fox affiliates directly to Fox Television Stations. The deal would see between six and ten Fox affiliates owned by Sinclair and Tribune (all in markets with an NFL team) become Fox owned-and-operated stations. It is not known if WUTV will be one of the stations sold, although the stations being sold to Fox are expected to be from Tribune Media (notably KCPQ in Seattle, where Sinclair already owns KOMO-TV), many of which were previously owned by Fox. A sale to Fox would make WUTV Buffalo's first Big Four network O&O since WBUF-TV (channel 17, now PBS member WNED-TV), which was owned by NBC from 1955 until its sign-off in 1958. On May 9, 2018, Sinclair announced that seven Fox affiliates would be sold to FTS, but WUTV was not included and an affiliation renewal was announced for that station instead, keeping WUTV with Sinclair. On August 9, 2018, Tribune announced it would terminate its merger with Sinclair following the deal pending a review by an administrative law judge regarding Sinclair's forthrightness in its applications to sell certain conflict properties, with Tribune also filing a breach of contract lawsuit against the company.

Newscasts
Until 2013, WUTV did not air news programming, making Buffalo the largest television market in the United States whose Fox affiliate did not offer any newscasts at all (Sinclair is believed to have paid a large fee to Fox to avoid the network's mandate that its affiliates carry local news). The station long opted to air syndicated programming instead of carrying news programming, as it is within range of the Toronto market and features advertising targeted at Southern Ontario viewers, along with the large number of stations within the Buffalo market and those receivable in the market from Hamilton and Toronto that already produce local newscasts.

This lack of local news programming ended on April 8, 2013, as the 10 p.m. newscast produced by NBC affiliate WGRZ channel 2 moved from WNYO-TV to WUTV. Along with the move, it was expanded to seven nights per-week, and the station also announced plans to air an encore of the final hour of WGRZ's morning show on a one-hour delay. These moves were part of an effort to better compete against the WIVB-produced newscasts in the same timeslots on CW affiliate WNLO—both of which have been historically more successful even though WGRZ has surpassed WIVB in most of its main newscasts. Under the terms of the agreement to carry WGRZ's newscasts on WUTV, Sinclair had no editorial control over the newscasts. In addition to carrying WGRZ's newscasts, WHAM-TV meteorologists provide Fox 29 Weather Updates between programs.

In March 2021, WUTV established a studio to produce content for Sinclair's national news programming, such as The National Desk. The station does not produce long-form news programming from this studio and continued to carry the WGRZ-produced program in the meantime.

On July 1, 2021, WUTV introduced a new in-house newscast; it used resources from other Sinclair-owned stations in the state of New York, with its anchors based out of WSTM-TV in Syracuse and its weather and sports segments produced from WHAM-TV in Rochester. The program failed to make much of a ratings impression; in the November 2022 sweeps period, the WIVB–WNLO newscast attracted four times as many viewers. As a result, Sinclair discontinued it effective January 27, 2023, with Sinclair's national news service, The National Desk, airing in its stead. Four people lost their jobs: a news director, two reporters, and a photographer.

Notable former on-air staff
 Maryalice Demler – weeknights at 10:00 p.m.
 Kevin O'Connell – chief weather anchor (fired in 2018 due to an endorsement dispute)

Technical information

Subchannels
The station's digital signal is multiplexed:

Analog-to-digital conversion
WUTV discontinued regular programming on its analog signal, over UHF channel 29, at 11:59 p.m. on February 17, 2009, the original target date in which full-power television stations in the United States were to transition from analog to digital broadcasts under federal mandate (which was later moved to June 12); this made WUTV the first television station in Buffalo to switch to digital. The station's digital signal remained on its pre-transition UHF channel 14. Through the use of PSIP, digital television receivers display the station's virtual channel as its former UHF analog channel 29.

As part of the SAFER Act, WUTV kept its analog signal on the air until March 3, 2009, to inform viewers of the digital television transition through a loop of public service announcements from the National Association of Broadcasters. WUTV, along with PBS member station WNED-TV (channel 17) were the only Buffalo television stations that did not terminate their analog signals on the new June 12 date.

Canadian coverage
Up until 2003, Rogers Cable carried WUTV in Ottawa and London, Ontario; that year, Rogers replaced WUTV with Detroit owned-and-operated station WJBK as the Fox station available in these markets. The reason for the switch in Ottawa was twofold. The main reason was that MCI, the company which microwaved U.S. network television signals to Ottawa from Rochester, New York, had decided to discontinue this service (until 2003, the ABC, NBC, and CBS stations available in Ottawa had originated from Rochester). Secondly, Rogers chose Detroit as the new source for U.S. television network signals because Canadian broadcasters were concerned about the increased Canadian advertising revenues that Buffalo stations would attract, were they to receive an expanded viewing audience across Ontario. Since Detroit (which like Buffalo, is located adjacent to a Canadian media market) is a much larger market than either Buffalo or Rochester, advertising prices would be much higher and it would therefore not be economical for Canadian businesses to purchase advertising time on such stations.

Although WUTV was the Fox affiliate available in Ottawa, Rogers decided to switch to WJBK in order to ensure uniformity in the source cities for all U.S. network television signals. Rogers switched to WJBK in the London market because the signal for the CBS affiliate available in London, WSEE-TV (out of Erie, Pennsylvania) was of lower quality than that of Detroit's CBS station, WWJ-TV. Hence, Rogers' London system switched from WSEE-TV to WWJ-TV and, as in Ottawa, decided to switch its Fox affiliate from WUTV to WJBK for source city uniformity for the U.S. network signals. Rogers continues to carry WUTV in both standard and high definition for customers in the Golden Horseshoe, including Toronto.

Cogeco Cable carries WUTV in standard definition for its customers in the Golden Horseshoe, but carries WJBK in high definition. For many years, WUTV was carried on cable in Quebec as far east as Gaspe, and was once carried on cable in Montreal and Montérégie until 1997, when Vidéotron replaced WUTV with WFFF-TV in Burlington, Vermont (the Fox station that signed on the air at the time). Originally, its sister station in Rochester, WUHF, was carried on cable in the Western Montreal suburbs during 1995. Those stations were the first Fox stations to be carried on cable in Montreal. It also returned temporarily when WFFF-TV was off the air for a brief time in the mid-2000s. WUTV was also carried via microwave on cable systems in Central New York, including the towns of Sullivan and Chittenango in the mid 1970s.

Because of its Canadian coverage, the station plays the respective American and Canadian national anthems "The Star-Spangled Banner" and "O Canada" and a display of both countries' national flags during its sign-off for maintenance on early Monday mornings between 3 and 5 a.m.

References

External links

Fox network affiliates
Charge! (TV network) affiliates
TBD (TV network) affiliates
Sinclair Broadcast Group
UTV
Television channels and stations established in 1970
1970 establishments in New York (state)